Russell Shoatz (August 23, 1943 – December 17, 2021), also known as Maroon, was an American political activist and writer who was a founding member of the Black Unity Council, as well as a member of the Black Panther Party, and a soldier in the Black Liberation Army. In 1973, he was convicted in connection with the 1970 murder of Philadelphia (PA) police  officer Frank Von Colln.

Underlying conviction
In August 1970, Philadelphia Police Sergeant Frank Von Colln (aged 43 and a father of two) was ambushed and murdered while talking on the phone in the Cobbs Creek guard house at the corner of 63rd and Catherine streets in Philadelphia. Von Colln was shot five times by members of a group known as the Revolutionaries after he had just dispatched two officers to investigate the shooting of another officer by members of the same group. Two other officers were shot and wounded in the same 24-hour period.

Arrest and prosecution
In January 1972, Russell Shoatz was arrested and charged in connection with Von Colln’s murder. In 1973, after a trial by jury, Shoatz was convicted of first degree murder, assault and battery with intent to murder, aggravated robbery and conspiracy.  He was sentenced to life in prison without possibility of parole. Four other suspects were also charged, convicted and sentenced to life in prison in connection with the murder of Von Colln.  In 1996 a sixth suspect was apprehended in Chicago and also charged, but was acquitted in 1999.

Incarceration
Shoatz began serving his life sentence in 1973.  In September 1977, Shoatz and several other inmates took over a cell block at Huntingdon State Correctional.

Shoatz injured several guards with a knife, and, along with three other prisoners, attempted to escape from the prison. Two of the inmates were captured immediately and a third was killed during the escape. Shoatz remained at large until he was captured in October 1977. Relocated to Fairview, a maximum security institution in Waymart, Pennsylvania, in 1980 Shoatz again escaped after another prisoner smuggled in a revolver and sub-machine gun. Three days later, a shoot out with state authorities ended in his capture.

In June 1991, Shoatz was transferred to solitary confinement where he was held for more than 22 consecutive years until February 20, 2014, when he was returned to the prison's general population.

The last dismissal of his legal counsel's appeal for his return to the regular prison population highlighted the fulcrum of the controversy:

In the volatile atmosphere of a prison, an inmate easily may constitute an unacceptable threat to the safety of other prisoners and guards even if he himself has committed no misconduct; rumor, reputation, and even more imponderable factors may suffice to spark potentially disastrous incidents. The judgment of prison officials in this context, like that of those making parole decisions, turns largely on purely subjective evaluations and on predictions of future behavior.

Shoatz was granted compassionate release on October 26, 2021, after suffering from advanced colorectal cancer. He died less than two months later, on December 17, at the age of 78.

Publications
 Liberation or Gangsterism: Freedom or Slavery (see )
 Maroon the Implacable: The Collected Writings of Russell Maroon Shoatz (see )
The Dragon and the Hydra: A Historical Study of Organizational Method

References

Lucas, A. (2021, September 15). The end of rage. Plough. Retrieved September 15, 2021, from https://www.plough.com/en/topics/justice/social-justice/criminal-justice/the-end-of-rage.

External links
Russell Shoats, Appellant v. Martin Horn; Philip Johnson, vls.law.vill.edu; accessed April 12, 2016.

1943 births
2021 deaths
Activists from Philadelphia
African-American history of Pennsylvania
African-American writers
American escapees
American male non-fiction writers
American people convicted of murdering police officers
American political writers
American prisoners sentenced to life imprisonment
Black Liberation Army
Escapees from Pennsylvania detention
Members of the Black Liberation Army
Members of the Black Panther Party
People convicted of murder by Pennsylvania
Prisoners sentenced to life imprisonment by Pennsylvania
Writers from Philadelphia
African-American male writers
20th-century African-American writers